Heavy Vegetable was a rock band based in Encinitas, California, which featured guitarist and lead singer Rob Crow, singer Eléa Tenuta, bassist Travis Nelson and drummer Manolo Turner. 11 years after their final studio album released, Crow, Nelson, and Turner reunited as Other Men and produced the album "Wake Up Swimming" which released in 2007.

Discography
 A Bunch of Stuff EP7 (1993, The Way Out Sound) 
 The Amazing Undersea Adventures of Aqua Kitty and Friends (1994, Headhunter/Cargo) 
 Frisbie (1995, Headhunter/Cargo) 
 Mondo Aqua Kitty (2000, Headhunter/Cargo)

V/A Compilations 

 Eyesore: A Stab at the Residents (1996, Vaccination Records) – "Time's Up"

References

Musical groups from San Diego